Rogers Airfield (also known as 30-Mile Drome) is a former World War II airfield near Redscar Bay, Papua New Guinea.

On November 15, 1942, the airfield was named in honor of Major Floyd "Buck" W. Rogers (C.O. of 3rd BG, 8th BS) who was KIA flying A-24 41-15797.

History
Rogers Airfield was built by American forces in mid-1942, and in use by the first week of June.   The airfield served as both a crash strip and also based aircraft for short periods in the early stages of the war.   Known units based at Rogers were:

 Headquarters, 35th Fighter Group (July 22, 1942 – August 15, 1943)
 39th Fighter Squadron, P-39 Airacobra
 40th Fighter Squadron, P-39 Airacobra
 41st Fighter Squadron, P-39 Airacobra

 7th Fighter Squadron (49th Fighter Group) P-40 Warhawk

After the war Rogers Field was used as a small commercial airport by Air Niugini.  Its commercial use ended in the 1960s and today the airfield is unused.

See also

 USAAF in the Southwest Pacific
 Port Moresby Airfield Complex

 Kila Airfield (3 Mile Drome)
 Wards Airfield (5 Mile Drome)
 Jackson Airfield (7 Mile Drome)
 Berry Airfield (12 Mile Drome)

 Schwimmer Airfield (14 Mile Drome)
 Durand Airfield (17 Mile Drome)
 Fishermans (Daugo Island) Airfield

References

 Maurer, Maurer (1983). Air Force Combat Units Of World War II. Maxwell AFB, Alabama: Office of Air Force History. .
 www.pacificwrecks.com

External links

Airfields of the United States Army Air Forces in Papua New Guinea
Airports established in 1942
1942 establishments in the Territory of Papua